The 50th Golden Bell Awards (Mandarin:第50屆金鐘獎) was held on September 26, 2015 at Sun Yat-sen Memorial Hall in Taipei, Taiwan. The ceremony was broadcast live by CTV.

Winners and nominees
Below is the list of winners and nominees for the main categories.

References

External links
 Official website of the 50th Golden Bell Awards 

2015
2015 television awards
2015 in Taiwan